is a passenger railway station in the town of Minakami, Gunma, Japan, operated by the East Japan Railway Company (JR East).

Lines

Station layout
The station consists of two opposed side platforms built on an embankment, and connected to the station building by an underground passage. The station is unattended.

Platforms

History
Kamimoku Station opened on 30 October 1928. Upon the privatization of the Japanese National Railways (JNR) on 1 April 1987, it came under the control of JR East.

Surrounding area
Kamimoku Onsen
Kamimoku Post Office

See also
 List of railway stations in Japan

External links

 Station information (JR East) 

Railway stations in Gunma Prefecture
Railway stations in Japan opened in 1928
Stations of East Japan Railway Company
Jōetsu Line
Minakami, Gunma